The men's high jump event  at the 1992 European Athletics Indoor Championships was held in Palasport di Genova on 28 February.

Results

References

High jump at the European Athletics Indoor Championships
High